Cara Black and Martina Navratilova were the defending champions from the last edition held in 2019, but neither chose to compete this year.

Kim Clijsters and Martina Hingis won the title, defeating Daniela Hantuchová and Laura Robson in the final, 6–4, 6–2.

Draw

Final

Group A

Group B

References
Ladies' Invitation Doubles

Ladies' Invitation Doubles